Live in Phoenix is the first live album by American rock band Fall Out Boy. It was released on April 1, 2008 in the United States by Island Records, available as a CD/DVD set or CD and DVD separately. The CD is a live recording of the band's 2007 Honda Civic Tour, recorded on June 22, 2007 at Phoenix's Desert Sky Pavilion. The DVD features the entire live performance, most of Fall Out Boy's music videos to date (with the exceptions being the three from their Take This to Your Grave album and their 2008 cover of Michael Jackson's "Beat It" which was released as a single from this album), a wealth of behind-the-scenes footage, and a making-of segment for the "I'm Like a Lawyer with the Way I'm Always Trying to Get You Off (Me & You)" video, which was filmed in Uganda. Beyond the band's own hits ("Sugar, We're Goin Down", "Thnks fr th Mmrs", "This Ain't a Scene, It's an Arms Race"), a wide array of covers are included, such as Akon's "Don't Matter", Timbaland's "One and Only" and fellow labelmate Panic! at the Disco's "I Write Sins Not Tragedies".

"Before watching ourselves on film we never really realized how much we swear", bassist Pete Wentz wrote on the band's blog, by way of explaining the strange title for the release. "It's pretty gross ... though it's edited as to not hurt your little munchkin ears. And as for how to say the name, well any little four letter word will work." The two-disc package debuted at number 1 on the Billboard's Music Video Sales chart. The CD was certified Platinum in the US by the Recording Industry Association of America (RIAA) on December 8, 2008 for 1,000,000 shipments.

Track listing

CD

DVD

Extra
Videos:
"Sugar, We're Goin Down"
"Dance, Dance"
"A Little Less Sixteen Candles, a Little More "Touch Me""
"This Ain't a Scene, It's an Arms Race"
"Thnks fr th Mmrs"
"The Carpal Tunnel of Love"
""The Take Over, the Breaks Over""
"I'm Like a Lawyer with the Way I'm Always Trying to Get You Off (Me & You)"

Behind-the-scenes footage

Collector's Edition bonus CD
"This Ain't a Scene, It's an Arms Race" – 3:47
"The Carpal Tunnel of Love" – 3:20
""The Take Over, the Breaks Over"" – 3:44
"I Slept with Someone in Fall Out Boy and All I Got Was This Stupid Song Written About Me" – 3:36
"Beat It" (featuring John Mayer, studio version) (Michael Jackson cover)

Personnel
Fall Out Boy 
Patrick Stump – Lead vocals, rhythm guitar, piano
Pete Wentz – Bass guitar, backing vocals, unclean vocals
Joe Trohman – Lead guitar, backing vocals
Andy Hurley – Drums

Additional
Dirty – Encore and dancing along with the song "Dance, Dance"
John Mayer – Guitar solo on "Beat It"
Gabe Saporta – Guest vocals on "Grand Theft Autumn/Where Is Your Boy"
Charlie Mark – Guest vocals on "I Slept with Someone in Fall Out Boy and All I Got Was This Stupid Song Written About Me"
Andres Stuart – Guest vocals on "I Slept with Someone in Fall Out Boy and All I Got Was This Stupid Song Written About Me"
Jim Sevcick – Guest vocals on "The Carpal Tunnel of Love"
Adam Siska – Bass guitar on "Saturday"

Certifications

References

External links

Live in Phoenix at YouTube (streamed copy where licensed)
Official Website

Fall Out Boy video albums
Live video albums
2008 video albums
2008 live albums